Algodoneros de San Luis (San Luis Cottonmen, also known as Los Algodoneros) are a professional baseball team based in San Luis Rio Colorado, Sonora, in Mexico. They play as a member of the Liga Norte de Mexico, a Minor League Baseball-organized farm system in Mexico and played their home games at Estadio Andres Mena Montijo de San Luis (Estadio sede).

Team history
The franchise actually was a descendant of the Triple-A Los Tecolotes de los Dos Laredos (Two Laredo Owls in the Mexican League) before moving to Tijuana to become Los Toros de Tijuana in 2004. They made the playoffs in their debut season. But, the Mexican League was reported to have stripped the Toros owner of his franchise and gave it to new owners who renamed that team the Tijuana Potros after the original Double-A team that folded in 1991. The Toros ownership kept the team name, logo, uniforms and history as a result of the alleged political wrangling that went on in that league.

The original ownership in Mexico were slated to bring the team to the independent Golden Baseball League and were expected to play in 2005, but could not come to a stadium deal in Tijuana. A ballpark was said to be ready in Chula Vista, California near San Diego should the team have decided to come to the league. They folded in 2005. Some say that the Toros were never a part of the GBL, however the league still includes them in their history. If they were to have joined the league, they would've not only been the league's first team based outside of the United States (that honor went to the travelling Japan Samurai Bears), but they would have also been the only privately owned team at the time.

See also
 Potros de Tijuana (Mexican League team)
 Tijuana Potros (Golden Baseball League team)
 Golden Baseball League

References

External links
 Liga Mexicana de Beisbol website (Spanish)
 Golden Baseball League website

Sports teams in Sonora